Callebaea is a genus of fungi within the Capnodiaceae family. This is a monotypic genus, containing the single species Callebaea rutideae.

References

External links 
 Callebaea at Index Fungorum

Capnodiaceae
Monotypic Dothideomycetes genera